Renon Boussière (31 August 1882 – 25 September 1915) was a French long-distance runner. He competed in the marathon at the 1912 Summer Olympics. He was killed in action during World War I.

See also
 List of Olympians killed in World War I

References

1882 births
1915 deaths
Athletes (track and field) at the 1912 Summer Olympics
French male long-distance runners
French male marathon runners
Olympic athletes of France
Sportspeople from Eure
French military personnel killed in World War I
Missing in action of World War I
Missing person cases in France